Fernando Figueroa (4 March 1849 – 16 June 1919) was the President of El Salvador from 14 May to 18 June 1885 and again from 1 March 1907 to 1 March 1911. He also served twice as Minister of National Defense and Governor of San Vicente.

Early and personal life 

Fernando Figueroa was born on 4 March 1849 in either Ilobasco or San Vicente, El Salvador. He married Luz Rodríguez in 1878 and they had six children, three daughters (María Luisa, Luz, and Carlota) and three sons. One of his sons married Marcela Gutiérrez, the daughter of General Rafael Antonio Gutiérrez, one of the leaders of the 1894 Revolution of the 44.

Military career 

Figueroa enlisted in the Salvadoran Army in 1863 during the War of 1863 against Guatemala. During the war, he was promoted to Lieutenant and was a distinguished soldier. He was severely wounded in the fighting, and despite fighting for the losing side under President Gerardo Barrios, he was still promoted to Captain during the Presidency of Francisco Dueñas. He waged war against Honduras three times, in 1871, 1872, and 1873.

In 1873, President Santiago González Portillo appointed him as Governor of San Vicente. In 1876, he was promoted to the rank of General. Figueroa was given supreme command of government forces during Justo Rufino Barrios' War of Reunification and against Salvadoran revolutionaries who supported Barrios' war.

President of El Salvador, first term 

President Rafael Zaldívar resigned on 14 May 1885. Upon his resignation, Figueroa became Provisional President. He appointed a cabinet consisting of Dr. Rafael Ayala as General Minister,  Dr. Isidro F. Paredes as Minister of the Interior and Public Instruction, Dr. Domingo López as Minister of Housing and the Marine, and Dr. Daniel Miranda as Sub-secretary of Foreign Relations, Justice, Cults, and Beneficiaries. He resigned on 18 June 1885 and was replaced by José Rosales Herrador, retiring from politics.

Inter-presidency 

Figueroa came out of retirement in 1890 when President General Carlos Ezeta reappointed him as Governor of San Vicente. On 1 March 1900, he was appointed as Minister of National Defense by President General Tomás Regalado.

President of El Salvador, second term 

Figueroa was elected President of El Salvador for a second term and took office on 1 March 1907. In 1907, he led El Salvador in a war against Honduras, Nicaragua, and Salvadoran rebels, which were led by José Santos Zelaya, the President of Nicaragua, General Manuel Rivas, a leader of the Revolution of the 44, and Prudencio Alfaro, the former Vice President of El Salvador from 1895 to 1898. The invasion violated the 1907 Central American Treaty of Peace and Amity which had been signed on 22 April 1907. On 11 June 1907, Figueroa gave a speech entitled "Proclamation to the Salvadoran People" in which he called on the army and people to stay loyal to him and resist the foreign invasion of the country. The invasion was denounced by the international community. The United States intervened diplomatically and ended the war on 20 December 1907 with the signing of a peace treaty in Washington, D.C.

His term expired on 1 March 1911 and he was succeeded by Manuel Enrique Araujo, his Vice President during his term in office. Figueroa was the last military President of El Salvador until Maximiliano Hernández Martínez assumed the Presidency following the 1931 Salvadoran coup d'état.

Death 

Figueroa died on 16 June 1919.

References

Citations

Bibliography 

1849 births
1919 deaths
Presidents of El Salvador
Finance ministers of El Salvador
Salvadoran military personnel
People from Ilobasco
19th-century Salvadoran people
20th-century Salvadoran politicians
Defence ministers of El Salvador